Sugiuridae is a family of cnidarians belonging to the order Leptothecata.

Genera:
 Multioralis Mayer, 1900
 Sugiura Bouillon, 1984

References

Leptothecata
Cnidarian families